Language of Nazi concentration camps refers to a common stratum created in various languages of inmates of Nazi concentration camps that described the notions unique to life in the camps and served as lingua franca.

One part of the Nazi camp slang was German language terminology for people, things and events in the camps, where many ordinary German words acquired specific meanings and associations. Another was ad hoc slang based on the various native languages of inmates from different countries.

See also
Glossary of Nazi Germany

Further reading
 Rocco Marzulli, Italiani nei lager. Linguaggio, potere, resistenza, Milieu, Milano 2019, 
 Rocco Marzulli, La lingua dei lager. Parole e memoria dei deportati italiani, Introduzione di Massimo Castoldi. Con tre saggi di Giovanna Massariello Merzagora, Donzelli, Roma 2017, 
 Nicole Warmbold, Lagersprache. Zur Sprache der Opfer in den Konzentrationslagern Sachsenhausen, Dachau, Buchenwald, Verlag Hempen, 2009, 
 Daniela Accadia, La lingua nei campi nazisti della morte, in I sentieri della ricerca. Rivista di storia contemporanea, 9-10, EDIZIONI CENTRO STUDI “PIERO GINOCCHI” CRODO, 2009
 Wolf Oschlies, Sprache in nationalsozialistischen Konzentrationslager. Theorie und Empirie der „Lagerszpracha“. Erstellt: 6. November 2004 | Aktualisiert: 15. Juni 2017
 Donatella Chiapponi, La lingua nei lager nazisti, Carocci editore, 2004, 
 Danuta Wesołowska, Wörter aus der Hölle. Die «lagerszpracha» der Häftlinge von Auschwitz, Impuls, Krakóv 1998
 Primo Levi, I sommersi e i salvati, Einaudi, Torino 1986
 Oliver Lustig, Dicționar de lagăr, Cartea Românească, 1982
 Aldo Enzi, Il lessico della violenza nella Germania nazista, Patron, Bologna 1971
 Andrea Devoto, Il linguaggio del 'Lager': annotazioni psicologiche, in Il Movimento di Liberazione in Italia, n. 65, 1961
 Victor Klemperer, LTI - Notizbuch eines Philologen, Berlin, 1947
 Boris Ottokar Unbegaun, Les argots slaves des camps de concentration, in Mélanges 1945, V, Études linguistiques, Les Belles Lettres, Paris 1947, pp. 177-191
 Georges Straka, L'argot tchèque du camp de Buchenwald, in Revue des études slaves, tome 22, fascicule 1–4, 1946, pp. 105–116.
 Marcel Cressot, Le parler des déportés français du camp de Neuengamme, in le français moderne, n. 1, janvier 1946, pp.11-17
 L'argot de déportés en Allemagne, in le français moderne, n. 1, janvier 1946, pp. 165-173
 Amsler, "Organisme" au camp de Dachau, in le français moderne, n. 3–4, juillet-octobre 1945, p. 248

External links 
 Concentration Camp Dictionary Retrieved March 27, 2011

Nazi concentration camps
Sociolinguistics
Language contact